The 1917 South Carolina Gamecocks football team represented the University of South Carolina during the 1917 Southern Intercollegiate Athletic Association football season. Led by first-year head coach Dixon Foster, the Gamecocks compiled an overall record of 3–5 with a mark of 2–3 in SIAA play.

Schedule

References

South Carolina
South Carolina Gamecocks football seasons
South Carolina Gamecocks football